SSIS may refer to:

 Self-Styled Islamic State, a name used for the Islamic State

Saigon South International School
Scandinavian Society for Iranian Studies
Shanghai Singapore International School
Suzhou Singapore International School
SQL Server Integration Services, a component of the Microsoft SQL Server database software that can be used to perform data migration tasks. 
State Security Investigations Service, former Egyptian intelligence service
Swiss School in Singapore